Gandhi Medical College (GMC) is a medical college in Madhya Pradesh, India. Established in 1956, it is located at Fatehgarh, Royal Market Area, Bhopal.

The following hospitals and institutes are under the college:
 Hamidia Hospital
 Sultania Zanana Hospital
 Kamla Nehru Hospital
 Regional Institute of Ophthalmology
 National Institute For Research in Environmental Health
 Cardiac Science Center
 Medico-Legal Institute
 Trauma & emergency Center
 State Virology Laboratory

Location
Gandhi Medical College is in the Fatehgarh area on Sultania Road in Bhopal, Madhya Pradesh. The college is situated on the ground Fatehgarh Fort once stood.

History
Gandhi Medical College, Bhopal was inaugurated on 13 August 1955 by Pt. Lal Bahadur Shastri. The college started its functioning in the building of the Polytechnic College with its first batch of 50 students and two departments: Anatomy and Physiology. The first Principal in 1955 was Dr. S.C. Sinha. The boys hostel was in the present Jehanuma Palace Hotel and the girls hostel was bracketed with the MLB college girls hostel at Banganga.

After one year the foundation of an independent building was laid by Union Minister of Home Shri Govind Ballabh Pant on 15 September 1956. It took seven years to complete the construction. This finished building, housed in the historic Fort of Fatehgarh, was inaugurated by the first Prime Minister of India Pt. Jawaharlal Nehru, on 13 March 1963. Also in attendance were Begum Sajida Sultan of Bhopal, Governor Shri H.V. Pataskar, Chief Minister Shri B.R. Mandloi, Health Minister Mr. M.P. Dubey and Principal Dr. R.P. Singh.

The foundation stone of the surgical and medical wards (Kamla Nehru Block known as KNB wards) was laid by Rajkumari Amrit Kaur the then Union Health Minister on 6 March 1955. The foundation stone of the boy's hostel was laid by King of Nepal Maharaj Mahendra Bir Vikram Shah Deo on 18 November 1955.

Hospitals for men and women were established as Prince of Wales Hospital and Lady Linlithgo Lansdowne Hospital respectively. The hospital changed names with change of reigns. Prince of Wales Hospital became Hamidia Hospital and Lady Linlithgo became Sultania Zanana Hospital. Both remain part of Gandhi Medical College today. Lady Bhore Centre opposite Fire Brigade, Fatehgarh caters to antenatal and child welfare activities in addition to preventive and social medical counseling.

Campus 
The campus building is housed in Fort of Fatehgarh which was inaugurated by the first Prime Minister of India Pt. Jawaharlal Nehru.

The campus houses:
 Main college building
 Hamidia hospital
 Kamla Nehru Hospital
 Regional Institute of Ophthalmology
 NIREH
 Central Pathology lab
 Blood Bank
 Rain Basera (for patients and their relatives stay)
 Two canteens: one old JDA canteen and a newly constructed one
 Hostels
 Animal House
 Guest House
 Sports ground (old) 
 Lake view Cricket Ground (under construction)
 Lawn Tennis court
 Badminton court
 Basketball court
 Sports complex which houses separate gym for Boys and Girls along with a multi-activity hall and table tennis arena.

College facilities

 Central Auditorium
 Four lecture theatres
 One newly reconstructed fully air-conditioned modern Lecture Theatre
 Four Examination Halls
 Boys common Room
 Girls common Room
 Lawn Tennis court
 Badminton court
 Basketball court
 Central Library
 Sports Complex

Central library
The central library is housed in the main building of the college on the underground floor. It is fully air-conditioned with all the facilities.

Facilities:
 Three halls for studying
 Central library room
 Reading room
 Annexe (Reading Room)
 Journal section
 Computer Room

Residential facilities
Residential facilities are available in the college campus for medical students, resident doctors, nurses, staff and professors.
 Hostel Block A - Senior Girls Hostel
 Hostel Block B - Senior Boys Hostel
 Hostel Block C - Senior Boys Hostel
 Hostel Block D - UG Girls Hostel
 Hostel Block E - PG Boys Hostel
 Hostel Block F - Junior Boys Hostel (first professional year students)
 Hostel Block G - Intern Girls Hostel
 Hostel Block H - PG Girls Hostel
 Nurse Hostel
 Residence for Teachers and Professors

Hostel block H and Nurse hostel are near the Kamla Nehru Hospital, while blocks A, B, F, C, D, E are in the hostel area.

G Block hostel is behind the main college building.

Academics
Recognized by Medical Council of India & State Paramedical Council M.P.
MBBS
MS, MD, Diploma courses in different subjects
M. Ch. in Paediatric Surgery
M. Sc. Medical Biochemistry
Paramedical courses in about ten departments

Affiliated to Madhya Pradesh Medical Science University, Jabalpur, Bhopal.

Departments 
 Anatomy
 Physiology
 Biochemistry
 Pharmacology
 Pathology
 Microbiology
 Forensic Medicine
 Community Medicine
 Ophthalmology
 Otolaryngology (ENT)
 Anesthesiology
 Surgery
 Medicine
 Pediatrics
 Obstetrics & Gynaecology
 Orthopedics
 Radiology
 Gastroenterology
 Skin V D
 TB Chest
 Cardiology
 Pediatric Surgery
 Cardiothoracic Surgery
 Burn & Plastic Surgery
 Psychiatry
 Dentistry
 Oncology

Administration
 Dean - Dr. Prof. Arvind Rai
Executive committee - Gandhi Medical College Society 
 Governing body - Gandhi Medical College Society, Department of Medical Education, Government of Madhya Pradesh.

The society has following Committees:
General Body
Executive Body
Finance Committee
Hospital Advisory Committee
Recruitment Committee
Academic Council
Board of Studies

Admissions
Admission to the MBBS course is through National Eligibility cum Entrance Test-UG (NEET-UG) and direct nominees of Govt. of India.

Admission to post-graduate courses (MS/MD) is through NEET-PG and in-service candidates of Govt. of Madhya Pradesh.

Medico-Legal Institute
The survey committee constituted in 1964 by the government of India considered that essential mission of a Medico-Legal institute should be to train the medical jurists. The Mudalier committee in 1962 recommended the creation of a separate cadre of specially trained medical jurists to look after the work of the state. The government of Madhya Pradesh created the 'First Medico-legal Institute in India' at its capital city Bhopal in 1977.

The Medico-legal Institute played a role in the management of the Bhopal disaster, when a poisonous gas (MIC, methyl isocyanate) leaked from one of the storage tanks of the Union Carbide factory on the night of 2–3 December 1984. Postmortem examinations were conducted and steps were taken to preserve bodily tissues and fluids for the further chemical examination in order to determine what gas/gases have been inhaled by the people.

National Institute for Research in Environmental Health

Scope of activities
National Institute for Research in Environmental Health (NIREH), Bhopal, is one of the permanent institutes of the Indian Council of Medical Research (ICMR), a government of India's apex autonomous organization for bio-medical research in the country.

Focused research on methyl isocynate (MIC) affected population of Bhopal in the areas of
 Respiratory disease
 Eye related diseases
 Kidney diseases
 Cancer
 Genetic disorders
 Congenital disorders
 Mental and neurological health
 Women related medical issues
 Second generation children related medical issues
 Rehabilitation
Improve environmental health research and play a leading role in tackling environmental health issues as an apex research institution on environmental health in India.

Thrust areas
1. NIREH will have a clinical research wing having the following departments
 General Medicine
 Respiratory Medicine/Pulmonary Medicine
 Ophthalmology
 Paediatrics
 Obstetrics & Gynecology
 Psychiatry/Mental Health
 Neurology
 Radio diagnosis
 Epidemiology/Community Medicine

2. The following facilities are in the process of being established at NIREH as part of Phase I of its
development:
 Molecular Biology Laboratory
 Microbiology Laboratory
 Biochemistry Laboratory
 Pathology Laboratory
 Haematology Laboratory
 PFT Laboratory
 Central Equipment Facility
 Department of Epidemiology including biostatistics and computing programming
 Database relating to research on toxic gas exposure and environmental contamination

Bhopal gas tragedy
Gandhi Medical College and Hamidia Hospital played a crucial role in emergency response and care after the Bhopal Disaster.

A regional institute of ophthalmology was established here after the disaster for the patients with eye problems due to MIC.

Studies performed in the institute:
 Health Effects of the Toxic Gas Leak from the Union Carbide Methyl Isocyanate Plant in Bhopal. Technical report on Population Based Long Term, Epidemiological Studies (1985–1994). Bhopal Gas Disaster Research Centre, Gandhi Medical College, Bhopal (2003?) Contains the studies performed by the Indian Council of Medical Research (ICMR)
 An Epidemiological Study of Symptomatic Morbidities in Communities Living Around Solar Evaporation Ponds And Behind Union Carbide Factory, Bhopal. Department of Community Medicine, Gandhi Medical College, Bhopal (2009)

References

External links 
 gmcbhopal.net- Official website of GMC, Bhopal.
 Website for alumni of GMC.

Universities and colleges in Bhopal
Medical colleges in Madhya Pradesh
1956 establishments in Madhya Pradesh
Educational institutions established in 1956